Port Dickson District is a district in Negeri Sembilan, Malaysia. It is the only coastal district in Negeri Sembilan. The district borders Sepang District, Selangor to the north, the Strait of Malacca to the west, Seremban District to the northeast, Rembau District to the east, and Alor Gajah District, Malacca to the south. It also surrounds Tanjung Tuan, an exclave of Malacca under the jurisdiction of Alor Gajah District, to its southwest.

Administrative divisions

Port Dickson District is divided into 5 mukims, which are:

 Jimah
 Linggi
 Pasir Panjang
 Port Dickson Town
 Si Rusa

Townships in Port Dickson District
 Port Dickson
 Bandar Springhill
 Bandar Sunggala
 Bukit Palong
 Jimah
 Kuala Lukut
 Linggi
 Lukut
 Pasir Panjang
 Pengkalan Kempas
 Si Rusa
 Teluk Kemang

Demographics

Federal Parliament and State Assembly Seats 
List of Port Dickson district representatives in the Federal Parliament (Dewan Rakyat)

List of Port Dickson district representatives in the State Legislative Assembly (Dewan Undangan Negeri)

References

External links